Trenton Estep  (born November 24, 1999) is an American professional racing driver. Estep grew up racing karts from the age of 4 years old in New Braunfels, Texas. He competed in various karting competitions such as SKUSA Pro Tour, Florida Winter Tour, US Open and Rotax Grand Finals in Portugal. In 2016 he made the transition from karts to open wheel cars. He entered the Formula Tour F1600, Canadian F1600 Super Series and F1600 Championship Series winning two Championships. He also ran in the opening round of the Redbull Global Rallycross Championship in Phoenix Arizona. In 2017 Estep made his transition from open wheel to cars in the North American Porsche GT3 Cup Series, with JDX Racing. Estep finished on podium 11 of 16 races with multiple wins placing 3rd in the Porsche GT3 Cup Championship. In 2018 he returned to the Porsche GT3 Cup series with JDX Racing with renewed sponsorship by Hertz Global along with a new sponsor Byers Porsche of Columbus Ohio. Estep went on to finish on Podium in 14 of 16 races winning the 2018 IMSA Porsche GT3 Cup Challenge Championship. A final honor to end his season was being chosen by Porsche Motorsports to attend the Porsche Junior Programme Shootout in Le Castellet at Circuit Paul Ricard. Estep was only 1 of 11 and the youngest at age 18 of the top Porsche drivers from all over the world under the age of 25 to receive the exclusive invite.

Racing career
Estep was born in San Antonio, Texas and started racing go-karts at the age of 4 at his local track called Hill Country Kart Club (HCKC) located in New Braunfels, Texas. He was mentored and supported by Tommy Muth of Texas Karts. Estep went on to win numerous club and Texas road racing championships before he started karting at a national level in 2011. In 2011 Estep finished sixth in the SKUSA Pro Tour TaG Cadet series. The championship was won by Colton Herta and was competed by other young talents such as Patricio O'Ward and Sophia Flörsch. In 2014 Estep joined Dallas Karting Complex (DKC) to win the SKUSA Pro Tour S5 Shifter class aboard his Sodi Kart chassis after sweeping both the SKUSA SpringNats and SummerNats and then wrapping up the SKUSA Pro-Tour title in Las Vegas at the SuperNats. The following year Estep raced in various Rotax Max Junior series with Koene USA winning the inaugural Maxspeed US Open Rotax Junior Championship aboard his Tony Kart chassis by sweeping Round 1 in Dallas, Round 2 in Grand Junction Colorado and securing the Title in Las Vegas.

In 2016 the Texas kart racer made the transition to racing open wheel cars. The main focus was the Quebec based Formula Tour F1600 and Super Series Championships. The American competed in a Honda powered Spectrum 015H entered by Exclusive Autosport. Estep clinched both Championships winning twelve out of seventeen races. He also set 4 track records. He shattered the F1 Canadian Grand Prix F1600 track record by an amazing 1.4 seconds. He also holds the track record at North America's oldest street race Trois Rivieres or GP3R as well as track records at Mont Tremblant and Calabogie. Because of his championship in the Formula Tour F1600 series Estep qualified to compete at the 2016 Mazda Road to Indy Shootout. Alongside the Formula Tour F1600 Estep competed in only a select few races in the Ontario based Toyo Tires F1600 Series where he finished third in the championship. Estep also competed in the US in only two race weekends F1600 Championship Series events at Road Atlanta and Virginia International Raceway. Estep won the second race of the weekend at Virginia International Raceway.

Estep made a one-off appearance in RedbullGlobal RallyCross with PMG Rallysport replacing Parker Chase at the Wild Horse Pass Motorsports Park in Chandler, Arizona. Estep received the last minute opportunity just days before the event only having 4 laps in a business parking lot to fit seat and test radio before leaving for Arizona. He had just received his drivers license. He had to teach himself how to drive in the dirt, E-Brake and jump a rally car off a dirt ramp 50' as he raced the car. He went on to lead the Final live on NBC Sports when his front suspension broke taking him out of the lead and the race.

In 2016 Estep also made the leap from Junior to Senior class in karting. He won in only his second start in the Florida Winter Tour in Round Two at Ocala Grand Prix. He competed against an international field including European World Champion Jordan Lennox-Lamb and Canadian Indy Car driver Zachary Claman DeMelo.

2017 - After receiving 22 offers at the end of 2016 to compete in various series including Porsche GT3 Cup, Lamborghini Super Trofeo, USF2000, Pro Mazda, US F4, Formula Atlantics, Pirelli World Challenge, IMSA Lites, and F2000. After a great deal of consideration Estep signed a contract with JDX Racing to run in the IMSA Porsche GT3 Cup Challenge Series. Estep finished on podium 11 of 16 races with multiple wins placing 3rd in the Porsche Championship.

2018 - In 2018 Estep returned to the IMSA Porsche GT3 Cup Challenge series with JDX Racing. Hertz Global also continued their sponsorship along with a new sponsor Byers Porsche of Columbus Ohio. Estep ended the 2018 Porsche GT3 Cup Challenge winning the Championship over close friend and competitor Roman DeAngelis

Racing record

2018 IMSA Porsche GT3 Cup Challenge Results

2018 Porsche GT3 Cup Challenge Champion

2017 IMSA Porsche GT3 Cup Challenge Results

Porsche GT3 Cup Challenge

American/Canadian Open-Wheel Racing Results

2016 Formula Tour F1600 Series Results

F1600

2016 F1600 Super Series Results

F1600

2016 Global RallyCross Championship Results

GRC Lites

 DNA - Did Not Attend.

2015 US Open Championship Results

Rotax Junior

2014 SKUSA Pro-Tour Results

Shifter - S5 Stock Moto

Complete WeatherTech SportsCar Championship results
(key) (Races in bold indicate pole position; results in italics indicate fastest lap)

† Points only counted towards the Michelin Endurance Cup, and not the overall LMP3 Championship.

References

External links

YouTube channel

1999 births
Racing drivers from San Antonio
Racing drivers from Texas
Sportspeople from San Antonio
Global RallyCross Championship drivers
24 Hours of Daytona drivers
Living people
AF Corse drivers
WeatherTech SportsCar Championship drivers
Michelin Pilot Challenge drivers
24H Series drivers
Le Mans Cup drivers